The Holdenville Hitters were a minor league baseball team based in Holdenville, Oklahoma. In 1912, the Hitters played as members of the Class D level Oklahoma State League before permanently folding during the season. Holdenville hosted home games at Stroup Park.

History
In 1912, Holdenville, Oklahoma first hosted minor league baseball, as the Holdenville "Hitters" became members of the Class D level Oklahoma State League, beginning league play in the eight–team league. The Anadarko Indians, Guthrie, Oklahoma team, McAlester Miners, Muskogee Indians, Oklahoma City Senators, Okmulgee Glassblowers and Tulsa Terriers joined the Holdenville to begin the 1912 season.

The Holdenville Hitters began Oklahoma State League play on April 30, 1912. On June 21, 1912, both the Anadarko Indians and Oklahoma City Senators teams disbanded from the league. After the two teams folded the league continued play. A second Oklahoma State League schedule was created with replacement clubs placed in Enid, Oklahoma and Eufaula, Oklahoma, but the league folded shortly after restructuring.

The Oklahoma State League folded on July 1, 1912. The standings when the league folded saw Holdenville finish in 4th place. The Hitters had a final record of 21–23, playing under managers Al Vorhees, Jim Bouldin and Johnny Hendley. The final standings were led by Okmulgee Glassblowers (38–10)  followed by the Tulsa Terriers (33–15), Anadarko Indians (24–23), Holdenville Hitters (21–23), McAlester Miners (21–25), Guthrie (15–33) and Oklahoma City Senators (15–33). The Eufaula team was 2–2 and Enid 1–4 in their brief period of play. The Oklahoma State did not return to play in 1913.

Holdenville, Oklahoma has not hosted another minor league team.

The ballpark
The 1912 Holdenville Hitters were noted to have played home games at Stroup Park. Strop Park is still in use today as a public park with amenities. The park is located at 12th and Oak Streets in Holdenville, Oklahoma.

Year–by–year record

Notable alumni
The roster for the 1912 Holdenville Hitters is unknown.

References

External links
 Baseball Reference

Defunct minor league baseball teams
Defunct baseball teams in Oklahoma
Baseball teams established in 1912
Baseball teams disestablished in 1912
Hughes County, Oklahoma